KJWR (90.9 FM) is a Christian radio station licensed to Windom, Minnesota. KJYL serves Southwest Minnesota. The station is owned by Minn-Iowa Christian Broadcasting, Inc.

References

External links
KJWR's official website

Christian radio stations in Minnesota
Radio stations established in 2008
2008 establishments in Minnesota
Windom, Minnesota